Etherley railway station served the village of Witton Park in County Durham, North East England, from 1847 to 1965 on the Wear Valley line. It was briefly reopened during the summers of 1991 and 1992 as Witton Park.

History 
Originally it was only open on market days and only appeared in timetables from September 1847. The station was resited on 16 October 1867 and it was proposed that the original station be converted to cottages. The name was shortened to Etherley on 1 July 1871.

The station did, however, remain open as a stop on the remaining section of the WXR until this too was closed to passengers on 8 March 1965. The station itself was closed to goods traffic on 1 November 1965.

Though the tracks were lifted on the Crook line by early 1968, the curtailed Wear Valley Line remained open to provide rail access to the Blue Circle cement works (later owned by Lafarge) and in 1988 BR introduced a summer Sunday extension to the regular  to  'Heritage Line' service to Stanhope. As this passed through the site of Etherley station, a campaign was started by the local residents to reopen the station. As a result of this campaign, the station was briefly reopened during the summer of 1991 as a stop on the extended 'Heritage Line' service. However, the service was withdrawn after the summer of 1992 and on 17 March 1993, the freight service to cement works (the last remaining traffic on the line) was withdrawn as it was decided to switch to road haulage.

The track was, however, mothballed and a campaign began in 1993 to preserve the line as a heritage railway. However the organisation struggled financially and the service was suspended a short time later, not recommencing until August 2006. After major efforts to clear the line of vegetation and repair damaged tracks, passenger services along the section between Stanhope and Bishop Auckland through Etherley were reintroduced 23 May 2010 and continued until the end of the 2012 season. Over this period, trains ran non-stop between Wolsingham and Bishop Auckland though it was suggested that Etherely could be reopened in the future.

Since 2014, the Railway Trust has operated passenger trains on selected weekdays and weekends for mostly tourist traffic using a class 122 "Bubble Car". Initially, this only ran between Wolsingham and Stanhope but, on 27 March 2016, this service was extended to Witton-le-Wear. In April 2018, the Weardale Railway CIC announced that works had commenced to lift a short section of track at Broken Banks (approximately 1/2 mile west of Bishop Auckland station) to enable the embankment to be repaired after subsidence had made the line unusable for passenger traffic. Once the works are complete it is intended to reinstate the tracks and extend the Stanhope to Witton-le-Wear passenger service back to Bishop Auckland West station. This extension makes the prospect of reopening Etherley station more feasible.

References

External links 

Disused railway stations in County Durham
Former North Eastern Railway (UK) stations
Railway stations in Great Britain opened in 1847
Railway stations in Great Britain opened in 1991
Railway stations in Great Britain closed in 1965
Railway stations in Great Britain closed in 1992
Beeching closures in England
1847 establishments in England
1992 disestablishments in England
Witton Park